George Henry Withers was a Puisne Justice of the Supreme Court of Ceylon who served from 1 January 1893 to 1900. Withers had acted as Puisne Justice From 6 July 1892 to 1 January 1893.

References

Citations

Bibliography

 

Puisne Justices of the Supreme Court of Ceylon
British expatriates in Sri Lanka
19th-century British people
19th-century Sri Lankan people